Elly Lefort (born 4 November 1987 in Saint-Nazaire) is a French and Monegasque bobsledder. He competed for Monaco until the 2013–14 season, before switching to compete for France.

Lefort competed at the 2014 Winter Olympics for France. He teamed with driver Loïc Costerg, Florent Ribet and Romain Heinrich in the France-1 sled in the four-man event, finishing 17th.

As of April 2014, his best showing at the World Championships is 20th, coming in the two-man event in 2013.

Lefort made his World Cup debut in November 2009. As of April 2014, his best finish is 8th, in a pair of events in 2010-11.

References

External links
 

1987 births
Living people
Olympic bobsledders of France
Sportspeople from Saint-Nazaire
Bobsledders at the 2014 Winter Olympics
French male bobsledders